The 2018–19 season was Chelsea Women's 27th competitive season and 9th consecutive season in the top flight of English football. It was the first season after the naming switch from Chelsea Ladies and also the first season in the rebranded FA Women's Super League. The season covers the period from 1 July 2018 to 30 June 2019.

Squad information

First team squad

New contracts

Transfers

In

Out

Coaching staff
{|class="wikitable"
|-
!Position
!Staff
|-
|Manager|| Emma Hayes
|-
|Assistant manager|| Paul Green
|-
|Coach|| TJ O'Leary
|-
|Head of Player Development|| Robert Udberg

Non-competitive

Pre-season

Competitions

Women's Super League

Matches

League table

Results summary

Results by matchday

FA Cup

WSL Cup 

Group 1 South

Knockout rounds

Champions League

Round of 32

Chelsea won 11–0 on aggregate.

Round of 16

Chelsea won 7–0 on aggregate.

Quarter-finals

Chelsea won 3–2 on aggregate.

Semi-finals

Lyon won 3–2 on aggregate.

References

Chelsea F.C. Women seasons